The  (EPI) is a European processor project to design and build a new family of European low-power processors for supercomputers, Big Data, automotive, and offering high performance on traditional HPC applications and emerging applications such as on machine learning. It is led by a consortium of European companies and universities. The project is divided in multiple phases funded under Specific Grant Agreements. The first grant agreement is implemented under the European Commission program Horizon 2020 (FPA: 800928) in the December 2018 to November 2021 time span. The second agreement will be implemented afterwards under the EuroHPC Joint Undertaking which issued a call answered to in January 2021 by the same consortium (H2020-JTI-EuroHPC-2020-02 FPA in EPI (phase II)).

The processor is a SoC, of RISC technology, implementing microprocessor cores of ARM architecture and accelerators, specialised in matrix calculations and deep learning for artificial intelligence. The processor is designed to be integrated in an exascale supercomputer, but also to be implemented in cars.

Objectives
The aim of the EPI project is to design and build a high-performance, low-power processor, implementing vector instructions and specific accelerators, such as accelerators for AI, with high-bandwidth memory access. The design will be based on the results obtained through an intensive use of simulation, the development of a complete software stack and the use of advanced semiconductor manufacturing technologies. During the development of the processor, a co-design methodology will be implemented to ensure that the processor is suitable for efficiently running many applications and that it is equipped with the appropriate software development tools. The objective of the EPI is to develop European know-how on the design and construction of processors for high-performance computing, allowing Europe technological sovereignty.

Members
EPI is a non-legal entity, a project organized by 30 institutions from 10 countries in Europe. The members of the consortium are:

History 
The initiative started in 2015, in the aim to produce an exascale supercomputer by 2023. The first phase of the project started in December 2018. In the summer of 2019, the basis of the architecture was decided. In January 2020, the first prototype was presented.

Organization of the project
The European Processor Initiative has five streams of operation. The first four are technical streams (Common Platform and Global Architecture, HPC General Purpose Processor, Accelerator, Automotive platform), while the last one is dedicated to the coordination and communication activities.

References

Bibliography
 Michael Feldman. "European Processor Initiative Readies Prototype". The Next Platform. Boone, NC: January 27, 2020. https://www.nextplatform.com/2020/01/27/european-processor-initiative-readies-prototype/ 
 Michael Feldman. "First European Pre-Exascale Supercomputers Forgo Homegrown CPUs". The Next Platform. Boone, NC: November 20, 2019. https://www.nextplatform.com/2019/11/20/first-european-pre-exascale-supercomputers-forgo-homegrown-cpus/ [talks about the delay in EPI]
 Nitin Dahad. "European Processor Initiative Announces Common Platform For HPC." EE Times Europe. Ebersberg, Germany. November 5, 2019. https://www.eetimes.eu/european-processor-initiative-announces-common-platform-for-hpc/
 Doug Black. "An Update on the European Processor Initiative". Inside HPC. 26 September 2019. https://insidehpc.com/2019/09/an-update-on-the-european-processor-initiative/
 Calista Redmond. "How the European Processor Initiative is Leveraging RISC-V for the Future of Supercomputing". Inside HPC. Westborough, MA. 22 August 2019. https://insidehpc.com/2019/08/how-the-european-processor-initiative-is-leveraging-risc-v-for-the-future-of-supercomputing/
 Sebastian Moss. "European Processor Initiative delivers first architectural designs to the European Commission". Data Centre Dynamics. London: June 4, 2019. https://www.datacenterdynamics.com/en/news/six-months-european-processor-initiative-delivers-architectural-designs-european-commission/
 Dan Olds. "The Plan for Europe’s Homegrown Exascale HPC". The Next Platform. Boone, NC: October 20, 2018. https://www.nextplatform.com/2018/10/24/the-plan-for-europes-homegrown-exascale-hpc/ [presents EPI initial timeline]
 European Commission. "European Processor Initiative: Consortium to Develop Microprocessors for Future Supercomputers". R&D World. 26 March 2018. https://www.rdworldonline.com/european-processor-initiative-consortium-to-develop-microprocessors-for-future-supercomputers/

External links 
 Official website

ARM architecture
Processor
Horizon 2020 projects
Microprocessors
Science and technology in Europe
Supercomputers